Anton Vyacheslavovich Piskunov (born 13 February 1989) is a Russian professional football player.

Club career
He made his Russian Football National League debut for FC KAMAZ Naberezhnye Chelny on 1 April 2012 in a game against FC Chernomorets Novorossiysk.

In January 2015, he signed with FC Luch-Energiya Vladivostok.

He made his Russian Premier League debut for FC Rotor Volgograd on 11 August 2020 in a game against FC Zenit Saint Petersburg.

References

External links
 

1989 births
People from Bryansk Oblast
Living people
Russian footballers
FC KAMAZ Naberezhnye Chelny players
FC Dynamo Saint Petersburg players
FC Luch Vladivostok players
Association football midfielders
FC Rotor Volgograd players
FC Rubin Kazan players
FC Neftekhimik Nizhnekamsk players
Russian Premier League players
FC Chayka Peschanokopskoye players
Sportspeople from Bryansk Oblast